Style.com was a luxury e-commerce website, launched by international media company Condé Nast in September 2016. In June 2017 Style.com was closed and absorbed by online retailer Farfetch.com

Before its closure Style.com offered established and emerging luxury brands, encompassing womenswear, menswear, beauty and grooming. The website combined e-commerce with original and curated content from Condé Nast's titles, including British Vogue and British GQ.

Using a proprietary website merchandising engine, Style.com offered a personalised commerce experience for the customer that adaptively recommends products and editorial stories based on the user journey.

A specially designed shopping layer also rendered editorial features on Vogue.co.uk and GQ.co.uk fully shoppable, allowing readers to purchase featured products available on Style.com.

President of Style.com Franck Zayan oversaw the UK-based website, with fashion and retail expert Yasmin Sewell as fashion director, Melissa Dick serving as editorial director, Jane Gorley as creative director and Natalie Varma as head of innovation.

Jonathan Newhouse, Robert A Sauerberg Jr, Anna Wintour, Nicholas Coleridge, Charles H Townsend, Pascal Cagni and Franck Zayan sit on the board of directors.

 Style.com history 
In 2000, Style was founded by Condé Nast and launched as the online site for fashion magazines Vogue and W . featuring online versions of some of the magazine's content as well as Internet-exclusive material such as event photographs and style-related articles, before Vogue'' developed its own website.

It featured material such as fashion news reporting, trend reports, and an extensive catalogue of runway imagery. That site including its runway archive, was taken offline on August 31, 2015.

Key contributors included Dirk Standen, Nicole Phelps and Tim Blanks and the site soon became famous for its fashion-week coverage, establishing itself as the global authority on runway and a champion of street style

Vogue and W later launched their respective websites and in 2010, Style.com moved to publisher Fairchild Fashion Media.

In late 2014, Style.com moved back to its original home, Condé Nast. In April 2015, the content on Style.com migrated to Vogue Runway, an existing channel on Vogue.com, and Condé Nast announced it would use the URL for a new e-commerce venture launching on 2 September 2016.

After failing to make an impression on consumers as an e-commerce site Style.com ceased trading in June 2017, just nine months after conception as an online retailer, and was absorbed by Farfetch.com, in a partnership the companies said would create “a seamless luxury shopping journey from world authority fashion inspiration to purchase gratification”. Moving forward Condé Nast plans to monetize their content on other platforms such as Vogue.com, etc. through a partnership with Farfetch where products featured online and in their print publications will be purchasable through Farfetch, with Condé Nast taking a commission. The failure of Style.com as an e-commerce platform was viewed by many in the industry as a costly mistake with Condé Nast having spent around US$100m on the venture.

References

External links
style.com

Fashion websites
Condé Nast websites
Online retailers of the United Kingdom
Internet properties established in 2000
Internet properties disestablished in 2017